Juan Pablo Farfán Bravo (born 2 February 1985) is a Peruvian former professional footballer who played as a defender.

References

External links
 
 

1985 births
Living people
Footballers from Lima
Peruvian footballers
Association football defenders
Club Alianza Lima footballers
León de Huánuco footballers
C.D. Antofagasta footballers
Peruvian expatriate sportspeople in Chile
Expatriate footballers in Chile